Gharo is a village and deh in Shaheed Fazil Rahu taluka of Badin District, Sindh. As of 2017, it has a population of 3,581, in 702 households. It is the seat of a tapedar circle, which also includes the villages of Akai, Kharach, and Koryani.

References 

Populated places in Badin District